Koottanad is a town in Nagalassery Panchayath of Pattambi taluk of Palakkad district, in the state of Kerala. It is situated at the border of Thrissur, Palakkad and Malapuram districts. It is located 32 km from the Thrissur and 65 km from Palakkad, on the road between Guruvayoor and Palakkad. It is connected by road to other parts of Kerala and the nearest Railway station is Pattambi 9 km away. Bharathapuzha Nila Riverflows through Thrithala, 5 km away. The  Pakkanar Memorial, a tribute to the Pariah saint of Parayi petta panthirukulam can be found at Thrithala. The Kattil Madam Temple, a small granite Buddhist monument on the Pattambi-Guruvayoor road, is of great archaeological importance. It is believed to date back to the 9th/10th century AD. The debris of a Fort (Tipu Sultan Fort)  can be seen behind Juma Mazjid, Koottanad between Koottanad and Chalissery Road.

Location
Koottanad is a junction of two major roads  Palakkad -Guruvayoor and Palakkad-Ponnani state highway.
It is located 65 km from the city of Palakkad and 25 km from Guruvayoor. The main roads from Koottanad are Kunnamkulam/Guruvayoor Road, Pattambi/Palakad Road, Edappal/Ponani Road, Peringodu Road and Thrithala/Kuttipuram Road.

Religious
The population consists of mainly Hindus and Muslims.

Festivals
Koottanad Nercha
Elavathukkal Pooram
Amakkavu Pooram

Political
It comes under the Thrithala block with M. B. Rajesh as the Legislative Assembly representative, while assembly constituency is part of Ponnani (Lok Sabha Constituency) Mr. E. T. Mohammed Basheer is representative. Earlier it was part of Ottapalam Constituency  Parliament.

Geography and climate
Koottanad  has similar climatic conditions prevalent elsewhere the state: a dry season from December through February, a hot season from March through May; the Southwest Monsoon from June through September and the North East Monsoon from October through November. The South West Monsoon is usually very heavy and is responsible for nearly 75% of the annual rainfall. The dry season is generally hot and humid, with temperature varying between 22 °C and 35 °C. The average annual rainfall is 2800 mm. It is a hilly region with herbs, fruits, valleys, lake  and brooks.

Transportation
Airports : Kozhikode's Calicut International Airport and Kochi's Cochin International Airport are at almost the same distance from Koottanad (about a two-hour drive).

Railways : The nearest railway stations are Pattambi (8 km), Kuttipuram (15 km) and Shoranur Junction (20 km).

Roads : Koottanad is located actually between two major state high ways. state Highway (SH 39)  Guruvayoor - Palakkad  and Thrithala Main Road connecting  Ponnani-Palakkad Highway.

Buses : All major long-route buses stop at  Koottanad  Junction.

Local Transport : Taxi's (Auto-rickshaws, Cars..etc.) are available at every road and at all major junctions they have their slots. Smaller buses ply on regular intervals to the internal locations, as there are narrow roads.

Education
Govt. Vocational Higher Secondary School-Vattenad
Govt. Higher Secondary School- Mezhathur
Govt. Higher Secondary School- Chalissery
Govt. Higher Secondary School- Chathanur
Higher Secondary School      - Peringodu
Govt. H.S - Nagalassery ( Vavanoor )
SIMAT Engineering College    – Vavanoor
Royal College of Engineering - Akkikkavu
Al Ameen Engineering College - Kulappully
Royal Dental college         - Chalissery
Ashtamgam Ayurvedam Chikitsalayam Vidyapeetham - Vavanoor

Notable residents
V. T. Bhattathiripad, Dramatist and a prominent freedom fighter
M. T. Vasudevan Nair, Malayalam Writer
Kuttimalu Amma (Ammu Swaminathan), Courageous freedom fighter and a prominent leader
Major Ravi, Malayalam film director
Captain Lakshmi Sahgal, Activist of the Indian independence movement
Maha kavi Akkitham Achuthan Namboothiri
E. Sreedharan-Former Managing Director of DMRC
Sudevan -Malayalam film director, film CR No: 89

References

External links

Kerala Government official site
Lsgkerala.in
Koottanad.com
Official website of Poomully mana Ayurveda treatment centre
Vaidyamadham.com
Cnsayurveda.com
Amakkavutemplke.com

Villages in Palakkad district